Hailin is a county-level city, under the administration of the prefecture-level city of Mudanjiang, in the southeast of Heilongjiang province, China, bordering Jilin province to the southwest. Ethnic groups include the majority Han Chinese as well as significant numbers of Manchu and ethnic Koreans.

Name and meaning

The name Hailin in English means "sea forest". Some people guess the meaning is "boundless forest", but the city was a merger of two counties, "Xinhai" and "Wulin", and its name was chosen by Chinese character in each of the old counties, and combined as"Hailin". In this sense, Hailin shares a name with the "boundless" Linhai Snowfield.

Hailin is today known by several descriptive names - "forest sea and snow plain", "hometown of Manchurian tigers", and "hometown of Chinese north medicine". However, in the past many knew Hailin from the story of people's revolutionary hero Yang Zi Rong, the real life hero Zhang Zonggui. His story was made into a modern, revolutionary Beijing opera Taking Tiger Mountain by Strategy, based the 1957 novel  by Qü Bo. Various movies have been made of the same story.

History

Hailin must have been inhabited even in the ancient times of the Shāng Dynasty or Yīn Dynasty, if not the Neolithic era. Historic sites include ancient Qunli rock paintings, Jiangdong ancient cemeteries of Jin Dynasty, the early site of the Qing Dynasty Ninguta city (from which a structure called Ninggu Ta - "Ninngu Tower" - remains), a wooden Russian Orthodox cathedral, a depot of the Chinese Eastern Railway constructed in 1903, and the Yang Zirong martyrs' cemetery.

During China's War of Resistance against Japanese Aggression (1937–45) the Japanese established a military airport at Hailin. Even recently (2005) aircraft bombs continue to be discovered during construction and other projects.

The present day administrative division traces its recent history to Xinhai county established in 1946. The division was changed to city-grade in 1992.

Administrative divisions 
Nowadays, there are 8 towns and 123 administrative villages in Hailin City. The towns include : 
 Hailin Town(), Zhangting Town(), Chaihe Town(), Sandao Town(), Erdao Town(), Hengdao Town(), Xin'an Korean Ethnic Town  and Shanshi Town()

Geography and resources

90% of the Hailin City administrative area is mountainous. Principal geographic features of Hailin include Shen Mountain, Qian Mountain, Qiulingman Mound, Haigu Plain, Zhangguancai Ridge, and 140 streams or rivers of the Mudanjiang water system (74 belonging to the Hailang drainage basin and 66 belonging to the Mudanjiang drainage basin). The larger rivers are the Mudanjiang River, the Hailang River, Sandao River, Erdao River, Toudao River, Shanshi River, Mijang River, Hongdian River, and Douyin River.

71% of the county is covered by forest. Important products include timber, medicinal herbs such as ginseng and eleutherococcus senticosus, and forest foods such as edible mushrooms, which are farmed in large quantities.

Climate

Tourism

Tourist activities include skiing. Other attractions include two national forest parks (Roaring Tiger Mountain and China Snowland), the largest artificial lake in northeast China (the Lotus Lake), and the largest animal raising center in China, if not the world (the Hengdaohezi  Northeast Tiger Center). Hengdaohezi Northeast  Tiger Park is the largest breeding center for Siberian tigers in the country. It was established in 1986 with 8 tigers, and has a population of some 256 tigers (as of 2006).

References

Footnotes

Sources 
(Flash) www.hailin.gov.cn
 Hailin  
www.chinadaily.com.cn
www.chinadaily.com.cn

Cities in Heilongjiang
County level divisions of Heilongjiang
Mudanjiang